The Scipion class was a class of three 74-gun ships built to a design by François-Guillaume Clairin-Deslauriers, the ingénieur-constructeur en chef at Rochefort Dockyard. These were the shortest 74-gun ships built by France since the 1750s, and they were found to lack stability as a consequence. The third ship - originally the Pluton - was 'girdled' (sheathed) with 32 cm of pine at Rochefort in 1799 to overcome her instability, and the design of two further ships ordered at the same dockyard in 1779 were lengthened.

  
Builder: Rochefort Dockyard
Ordered: early 1778
Begun: 10 April 1778
Launched:  19 September 1778
Completed: February 1779
Fate: Wrecked in Samana Bay, off San Domingo on 19 October 1782.

  
Builder: Rochefort Dockyard
Ordered: early 1778
Begun: 1 April 1778
Launched: 5 October 1778
Completed: February 1779
Fate: Razéed to 50-gun frigate in February to June 1794, and renamed Hydre in May 1795; discarded 1797.

  
Builder: Rochefort Dockyard
Ordered: early 1778
Begun: 10 April 1778
Launched:  5 November 1778
Completed: February 1779
Fate: Renamed Dugommier on 17 December 1797. Taken to pieces at Brest in 1805.

References

Winfield, Rif and Roberts, Stephen S. (2017) French Warships in the Age of Sail 1626–1786: Design, Construction, Careers and Fates.. Seaforth Publishing. .
Winfield, Rif and Roberts, Stephen S. (2015) French Warships in the Age of Sail 1786-1861: Design, Construction, Careers and Fates.. Seaforth Publishing. .

 
74-gun ship of the line classes
Ship of the line classes from France
Ship classes of the French Navy